The discography of Every Little Thing, a J-pop duo (former trio) formed in 1996 by Mitsuru Igarashi (synthesizer, music producer), Kaori Mochida (vocals, songwriting) and Ichiro Ito (guitar, songwriting), consists of eleven studio albums, six compilation albums, five remix albums, and numerous singles and videos, many of which were commercially successful. The band debuted with their single "Feel My Heart" on August 7, 1996, which peaked at number twenty-four on the Japanese Oricon charts. Their first number one single was "For The Moment", released on June 4, 1997. Their most successful year was 1998, in which they released their 8th single "Time Goes By" which topped the charts and sold more than a million copies. Their second studio album Time to Destination released that year sold more than 3.5 million copies in Japan, their best-selling album to date. Number one singles of the band include "Forever Yours" (1998), "Fragile" (2001), Untitled 4 Ballads (2002) and "Koibumi" (2004).

Since their debut, Mitsuru Igarashi wrote, composed, arranged and produced almost all of their music, but in 2000 he decided to leave the group. Since then, Mochida and Ito started to take more control in their music making process as a band. However, in 2009-2000, Igarashi and Every Little Thing met again and worked together in their album Change.

Albums

Studio albums

Compilation albums

Remix albums

Extended plays

Singles

Other appearances

Vinyl sets 
The Remixes Analog Box Set (December 19, 1997)
The Remixes II Analog Set (June 16, 1999)

Video albums 

DVD-Audio
Every Best Single +3 (January 28, 2004)
 (December 15, 2004)

External links
 Official website

References

Discographies of Japanese artists